Van Biljon is an Afrikaans surname. Notable people with the surname include:

Pite van Biljon (born 1986), South African cricketer
Suzaan van Biljon (born 1988), South African swimmer, sister of Pite
Willem van Biljon (born 1961), South African businessman

Afrikaans-language surnames
Surnames of Dutch origin